Foolad Natanz Football Club is an Iranian football club based in Natanz, Iran. In 2010, the license of Sepahan Novin Football Club was bought by Foolad Natanz.

They competed in the 2010–11 Azadegan League.

Season-by-season
The table below chronicles the achievements of the Club in various competitions.

See also
 Sepahan Novin F.C.
 Sepahan F.C.

References

Football clubs in Iran
Association football clubs established in 2010
2010 establishments in Iran
Association football clubs disestablished in 2011
Defunct football clubs in Iran